Xgħajra Tornados F.C. is a football club from Xgħajra, Malta. The team was founded in 1985, and joined the Maltese Football Association in 1994

Immediately after its founding, the Tornados achieved first place and second place in the league.

The Tornados took part in the Maltese Premier League in Season 1997-1998 and Season 2000-2001. Their first outing in the Premier League was in the 1997/98 season, where they beat the Pieta Hotspurs 1–0.

For many years, the Tornados remained undefeated in matches with the Zabbar St Patricks FC. This streak ended in November 2014, when the St Patricks  defeated the Tornados 2–0. The highest score in all derby league matches marks Xgħajra T = 8 vs Zabbar.St Patricks = 1.

References 

Association football clubs established in 1985
Football clubs in Malta
1985 establishments in Malta
Xgħajra